Kuching primarily refers to Kuching City, a city in Malaysia.

Kuching may also refer to:

 Kuching Division, an administrative Division in Sarawak, Malaysia
 Kuching District, a district within Kuching Division
 Bandar Kuching (federal constituency), represented in the Dewan Rakyat